Tokio is a Japanese rock/pop band formed by Johnny & Associates that debuted in 1994. It is made up of three men who were signed with Sony Music Entertainment from 1994 to 2001, with Universal Music Japan from 2001 to 2008, and are now signed under J Storm, a label owned by Johnny & Associates. In addition to their activities as a band, the members of Tokio also act in dozens of dramas and host variety programmes, both as a group and individually.

The group's name "Tokio" was the old English romanization for Japan's capital Tokyo, and remains the current transliteration in several European languages. Unlike most other bands under Johnny & Associates, where all of the band members are usually only vocalists, Tokio only has one main vocalist, a drummer, a guitarist, a bassist, and a keyboardist. Bassist Tatsuya Yamaguchi was kicked out of the band in May 2018 following a sexual harassment scandal involving a high-school-aged girl. Subsequently, less choreography is used in concerts and promotional videos, and their music is often more rock-centric.

Since their debut in 1994, they have sold about 9 million copies.

History

1989–1993: Formation
Like the members of SMAP, the members of Tokio performed as background dancers for the idol group Hikaru Genji mainly in the form of the back-dancing group Heikeha, which also involved members of the band V6. In 1989, guitarist Shigeru Joshima and bassist Tatsuya Yamaguchi discovered they both played instruments in their own bands and decided to form their own, practicing in private and unknown to the company, calling themselves Joshima Band, or "Joh Band" for short. At one point, they also called themselves 'JURIA', combining their names using Joshima's "J", "URI" from the melon-shape of Yamaguchi's face, and rhythm-guitarist member Takehito Asakura's "A". Eventually, Johnny accepted them as a band, giving them the name "Tokio Band". At this point, members included Joshima, Yamaguchi, and new support member, rhythm guitarist Kazuhisa Watanabe.

In 1990, the original Tokio was formed when Joshima was put together with drummer Masahiro Matsuoka and keyboardist Taichi Kokubun, both of whom had also joined Joshima and Yamaguchi in a few of their practices in the past. Rhythm guitarist and vocalist Hiromu Kojima joined the group soon after this. During this time, Joshima underwent negotiations with Johnny Kitagawa himself into allowing Yamaguchi to join the band, and soon he became an official member as well. Tomoya Nagase, another Junior vocalist who had been making more and more headlines, began appearing with the newly formed Tokio on occasion as a support member, which created a bit of odd tension as the group appeared in magazines and on the radio with five members, but on TV and live performances with six members. One of their first live tours included one with the band SAY・S and included all six members.

1994–1999: Debut and onward
In 1994, just before the release of the band's debut single, "Love You Only", founding member Hiromu Kojima was succeeded by Nagase following Kojima's departure. Their debut single was released on September 21, 1994. Two months later, on November 21, 1994, their debut and self-titled album, Tokio was released. Their very first performance after their debut was held on New Year's Eve at the 1994 NHK Kouhakutagassen.

Soon after the release of Tokio, the band's first remix album was released in 1995, titled Tokio Remix. In 1996, the band recorded the song "7 O'Clock News" to be used as the theme song for the anime version of Kodocha. Due to licensing issues however, the song was not used as the theme song for the North American release of the series. Also in 1996, the band's first compilation album was released, titled Best E.P Selection of Tokio.

Throughout the rest of the decade, Tokio released 18 more singles and four more studio albums: Bad Boys Bound, Blowing, Wild & Mild, and Graffiti. From 1997 and onwards, some of the band's singles were used as theme songs in television shows, usually drama shows. In 1997, "Furarete Genki" was used as the theme song to Psychometrer Eiji a drama Matsuoka starred in, and "Julia" was used as the theme song for Seiji No Mikata, a drama that starred Taichi Kokubun. In 1999, "Love & Peace" was used as the theme song to Love and Peace, another drama that Matsuoka starred in, and "Ai no Arashi" was used as the theme song for Psychometrer Eiji 2.

2000–2004: Rise in popularity
In early 2000, Tokio released the album Yesterday & Today. Following the release of the single "Doitsu Mo Koitsu Mo" in early 2001, Tokio switch recording labels from Sony Music Entertainment to UMG. From the following single, "Oh!Heaven" was the theme song for Tengoku ni Ichiban Chikai Otoko, a drama that starred Matsuoka, and "Hitoribotchino haburashi" was the theme song for Mukodono!, a drama starring Tomoya Nagase. From then on, the majority of subsequently released singles would be used as theme songs for dramas starring members of Tokio. In December 2001, the first album under Universal Music, 5 Ahead, was released.

In May 2001, Tokio released their second compilation album, titled Best EP Selection of Tokio II. Since the release of the single "Ding Dong / Glider" in late 2002, the promotional videos for Tokio songs are directed by Masahiro Matsuoka. 2003 saw the release of the seventh studio album, Glider in February. In 2003, "Ambitious Japan!" was used as the theme song for JR Central's Nozomi train services on the Tōkaidō & San'yō Shinkansen lines.

In 2004, Taichi Kokubun took a leave from Tokio to form the temporary music unit Toraji Haiji with KinKi Kids member Tsuyoshi Domoto. Together they recorded the theme song for the movie Fantastipo, in which they starred in. To commemorate the tenth anniversary of their debut, Tokio released their first cover album, TOK10 in September 2004. It became the band's first number-one album.

2005–2017: Established band

In February 2005, the tenth full-length album (not including compilation albums), Act II was released. They released the single "Ashita o Mezashite!" on December 7, 2005. Tomoya Nagase composed and co-arranged the single with his lyrics, making it their first single composed by a member of the group. In 2005, Tokio was selected to be the host for the Johnny's Countdown 2005-2006 concert, a yearly event that counts down to the New Year. In 2006, Tokio released the single "Sorafune", which sold over 400,000 copies and charted for over four months, making it their most successful single. The Tokio single "Get Your Dream" was used as the theme song in Japan for the 2006 FIFA World Cup. Later in 2006, the group released their longest studio album to date, Harvest, containing seventeen tracks and two remix tracks.

In 2008, Tokio's shortest album was released, titled Sugar. The seven-track album contains the three singles released in 2007. Also in 2008, the band changed recording labels for the second time, switching to J Storm, a label owned by Johnny & Associates. Subsequently, all albums, singles, and other releases previously released under Universal Music were re-released on June 24, 2009.

Their first release under the new label was the four-track single "Amagasa/Akireru Kurai Bokura wa Negaō" on September 3, 2008. "Amagasa" was composed by Ringo Shiina with her lyrics and was arranged by Tokyo Jihen. Tokio released another four-track single titled "Taiyō to Sabaku no Bara/Subeki Koto" on August 19, 2009. After releasing the single "Advance/Mata Asa ga Kuru" on February 3, 2010, they released the single "Haruka" on June 16, 2010. "Haruka" went on to become their first number-one since December 2007. On 11 August 2010, they released the single "NaNaNa (Taiyo Nante Irane)", written by Kōji Tamaki and arranged by Anzen Chitai. Next they released the single "Miageta Ryūsei", which was used as the theme song for Kōkōsei Restaurant, a drama starring Matsuoka. Ahead of the Plus tour, which ran from March to May 2011, Tokio released their first digital single, "Plus", on dwango.jp for a limited time.

On 22 August 2012, Tokio released their twelfth studio album titled 17, their first full-length album in six years. To support the album, the band embarked on the 1718 tour, which ran until September. Tokio's third compilation album, Heart, was released in July 2014. It included two new songs, "Heart" and "Kokoro", written by Nagase and Joshima. Heart went on to become the band's second number-one album. Tokio's final single, "Kumo", was released on 30 August 2017.

2018–present: Music hiatus
On 25 April 2018, news broke that Yamaguchi had been referred to prosecutors for allegedly kissing a girl against her will at his home in February 2018. On 6 May 2018, Johnny & Associates announced that they had terminated their contract with Yamaguchi. As a result of the scandal, Tokio indefinitely suspended all music activities.

In July 2020, Nagase announced that he was to leave the band to pursue his own endeavors. On 31 March 2021, he withdrew from Tokio and retired from the entertainment industry. On 1 April, the remaining members established a new company called Tokio Co., Ltd. which operates in affiliation with Johnny & Associates. Joshima was made the president of the company, while Kokubun and Matsuoka became the vice presidents.

Band members
Current members
  is the guitarist, vocalist and leader of Tokio. He was the original member, having founded the band in 1989.
  is the drummer and vocalist for the band, having joined in 1990.
  is the keyboardist, pianist and vocalist. He joined in 1990.

Former members
 , like most of the other band members, joined in 1990, but left the band in 1994, just prior to their debut. He was the rhythm guitarist and lead vocalist, and was replaced by Tomoya Nagase.
  was the bassist and vocalist for Tokio, who also joined in 1989. He left the band in 2018.
  is the lead vocalist and guitarist. He is occasionally known for being the youngest member of the band. He is also an actor and has starred in numerous dramas, such as My Boss My Hero. Nagase was the last member to join Tokio, joining in 1994, but having made appearances with them before that. He was fifteen years old when the band debuted. He has announced in July 2020, that he was to leave the band to pursue his own endeavors.

Timeline

Discography

Studio albums
 Tokio (1994)
 Bad Boys Bound (1995)
 Blowing (1996)
 Wild & Mild (1997)
 Graffiti (1998)
 Yesterday & Today (2000)
 5 Ahead (2001)
 Glider (2003)
 Act II (2005)
 Harvest (2006)
 Sugar (2008)
 17 (2012)

Compilation albums
 Best E.P Selection of Tokio (1996)
 Best EP Selection of Tokio II (2004)
 Heart (2014)

Appearances

Variety
Tokio currently hosts  and has previously hosted  and 5LDK, all variety shows. Tokio members have also performed in other variety shows both as a group, such as on Tetsuwan Dash (ザ!鉄腕!DASH!!), as well as individually. Below is a list of individual performances:
  – Taichi Kokubun (with regular guest Shigeru Joshima)
  – Shigeru Joshima
  – Shigeru Joshima
  – Tatsuya Yamaguchi
 R30 – Taichi Kokubun
  – Taichi Kokubun
  – Taichi Kokubun
  – Taichi Kokubun
  – Shigeru Joshima

Commercials
As of November 2013, Tokio is involved in a nationwide advertising campaign promoting rice from Fukushima Prefecture.

References

External links
 J-Storm TOKIO official website
 Johnny's Entertainment Tokio official website
 Universal Music Japan official website
 Sony Music Japan official site

 
Japanese pop rock music groups
Japanese idol groups
Japanese boy bands
Johnny & Associates
Musical groups established in 1994
Japanese rock music groups
J Storm